Burundu is a rural village in Kakamega County of the former Western Province in Kenya.

It is part of the West Kabras ward of Malava Constituency and Kakamega County Council.

The people of Burundu are the Kabras, a subgroup of the Luhya.

The main economic activity is sugar cane farming as a cash crop. Maize and sweet potatoes are grown for subsistence use. Cattle, sheep, goats, chicken and ducks are all reared on small scale.

There is only one public primary school: Burundu Primary School. There is no secondary school, most children go to neighbouring villages' schools. The village is sparsely populated, with most people literate. Some of the prominent scholars from this village include Dr Shikuku Musima Mulambula, a senior lecturer at Moi University, Department of Educational Psychology, and Mr. Chemuku Wekesa, who works as a research scientist at Kenya Forestry Research Institute (KEFRI), Coast Eco-Region Research Programme. Mr. Chemuku Wekesa has a Master of Science degree in forest ecology from Egerton University and B.Sc. degree in forestry from Moi University.

The village has famous traditional medicine-men and traditionalists, including Mr. Murunga Joseph Mulambula, who is also a teacher. Some very old herbs species still exist on the banks of River Lusumu bordering Burundu to the South.

The former Kenyan footballer Jonathan Niva came from Burundu village. His funeral officially agitated the love of reggae music among the youth of this village.

The extra high voltage (132 kV ) transmission line  from Owen Falls, Jinja, Uganda crosses Burundu village on its way to Nairobi via a sub-station at Kesses, near Eldoret. There is a power sub-station in neighbouring Musaga village, that connects the whole of Western Kenya to the national grid. The village is, however, not supplied with electricity.

Road network coverage is good, but trailers transporting sugar cane mess them when sugar cane is harvested. Mobile phone network coverage is provided by Zain, Yu and Safaricom that have base stations in Nambacha and Muhuni.

References

Populated places in Western Province (Kenya)
Kakamega County